Latvia participated in the Junior Eurovision Song Contest 2005 which took place on 26 November 2005, in Hasselt, Belgium. The Latvian broadcaster Latvijas Televīzija (LTV) organised a national final in order to select the Latvian entry for the 2005 contest. On 17 September 2005, Daniels Groza & Monta Beļinska (later renamed as Kids4Rock) won the national final and were selected to represent Latvia with the song "Es esmu maza, jauka meitene".

Before Junior Eurovision

National final
44 songs were submitted to LTV. Ten entries were selected for the national final, and the competing artists and songs were announced on 30 May 2005.

The final took place on 17 September 2005 at the Jūras vārti Theatre in Ventspils, hosted by Valters & Kazha. Ten entries competed and the song with the highest number of votes from the public, "Es esmu maza, jauka meitene" performed by Daniels Groza & Monta Beļinska, were declared the winners.

At Junior Eurovision

Voting

Notes

References 

Junior Eurovision Song Contest
Latvia
Junior